Elvira Fernández may refer to:

Elvira Fernández de Córdoba, 16th-century Spanish noblewoman
Elvira Fernández, vendedora de tiendas, 1942 Argentine film
Elvira Fernández Balboa, wife of former Spanish Prime Minister Mariano Rajoy